Maligno is an ABS-CBN primetime horror-action-thriller which was the second installment of Sineserye Presents: The Susan Roces Cinema Collection.
The show is adapted from the 1977 movie of the same name which starred Susan Roces who makes a guest appearance in the television program. It premiered from April 28, 2008, to May 23, 2008, replacing Palos, was replaced by My Girl.

This series can be streaming on Jeepney TV Youtube channel every 8:00 & 8:30 pm replacing !Oka Tokat.

Overview

Origin
It is based on 1977 film starring the Queen of Philippine Movies, Susan Roces, that won her second FAMAS Best Actress trophy. The 1977 movie was directed by Celso Ad. Castillo, who also wrote the original screenplay together with Dominador B. Mirasol.

The film stars included Dante Rivero, Celia Rodriguez, and Eddie Garcia. The film revolves about Angela after being impregnated by an evil spirit,she fears that her child will be the evil one's offspring.Besides that she and her family are hunted down by a coven of satanists and witches attempting to rob her soul.

Synopsis

The Chosen Carrier
After leaving her baby girl at a convent, Selya and her three companions die in succession while trying to escape a satanic cult. Later on, Selya's daughter is adopted by a wealthy but childless couple and is christened as Angela. However, her adoptive father never learns to love her and becomes even more distant when his wife dies during labor.

Despite her lonely childhood, Angela later becomes a successful newscaster. Her staff even throws a surprise party for her to celebrate the nomination of “Kulam”—a story featured in her news magazine show—for an Emmy Award. But instead of bursting out with joy, Angela is shaken by the news. As it happens, that particular episode makes her feel guilty because the woman who was accused of witchcraft in her scoop was later killed by her neighbors, leaving her daughter alone in the world.

Worse, her show will be reformatted and improved only on the condition that she makes a follow up piece on the story. Still upset by these developments, she retires to her office for some peace and quiet, only to encounter a crazed man who is lusting after her. When she is about to call the guard for help, the man suddenly disappears. Angela quickly brushes the incident off as a hallucination. But when she arrives home, she discovers her maids are dead and she is raped by the devil himself.

The Cult
A Satanic worship is being emphasized in the story, the cult is believed to worship the devil and does everything their leader tells them, they also believe that the Time of the Birth is coming. The cult also altogether keeps the group a secret, in every death that was believed to be done by the devil, they're the ones who clean up and make the scenes appear like accidents.

The Curse of the Son
The son Angela's been taking care of is believed to be carrying a curse: whoever tries to stop the destined life of the child or sometimes for no particular reason, the person dies.

List of deaths from the series that were related to the prophecy, Lucas, Angela, and Angelo.

Cast and characters

Main cast

Supporting cast

Guest cast
Susan Roces as Introducer
Mylene Dizon as Liz Pascual
Debraliz as Elena Castillo
Rio Locsin as Selya
Susan Africa as Gladya

DVD release
A DVD containing all 20 episodes of Maligno was released by Star Home Video on June 20, 2008.

See also
List of programs previously aired by ABS-CBN
Sineserye Presents

References

External links
 

ABS-CBN drama series
Philippine horror fiction television series
2008 Philippine television series debuts
2008 Philippine television series endings
Fiction about the Devil
Witchcraft in television
Fictional depictions of the Antichrist
Satanism in popular culture
Television series about cults
Television series by Dreamscape Entertainment Television
Live action television shows based on films
Filipino-language television shows
Television series by Star Creatives
Television shows set in the Philippines